Equality Texas is a statewide political advocacy organization in Texas that advocates for lesbian, gay, bisexual, and transgender (LGBT) rights, including same-sex marriage.

History 
Equality Texas was founded in 1989 as a 501(c)(4) nonprofit corporation. Equality Texas Foundation was founded in 1990 as a 501(c)(3) nonprofit corporation.

Structure 
Equality Texas comprises Equality Texas Foundation, a 501(c)(3) nonprofit corporation engaged in research and public education on LGBT issues, and Equality Texas, a 501(c)(4) nonprofit corporation engaged in statewide political LGBT advocacy.

Programs 
Equality Texas programs currently active include:

The Equality Poll
Public polling on state of LGBT issues in Texas.

Safe Schools Initiative
A public policy campaign advocating for changes in the Texas Education Code dealing with bullying and harassment.

Equality Project
A public education program on LGBT policy issues and their effect on Texas citizens.

Why Marriage Matters Texas
A program with Freedom to Marry working to legalize same-sex marriage in Texas. The program was launched in early 2014.

Pride in Faith
A public forum for open discussion about the intersection of faith and sexual identity.

Equality Is Good For Business
Public education campaign on major employers in Texas that have adopted LGBT-inclusive non-discrimination policies.

See also 

 LGBT rights in Texas
 Recognition of same-sex unions in Texas
 List of LGBT rights organizations

References

External links 
 

LGBT law in the United States
LGBT political advocacy groups in Texas
Organizations established in 1989
Organizations established in 1990
1989 establishments in Texas
1990 establishments in Texas
Charities based in Texas
Equality Federation
Organizations based in Austin, Texas
501(c)(4) nonprofit organizations